Visions of Eden is the eleventh album by American heavy metal band Virgin Steele, released on September 8, 2006 via Sanctuary Records. The album is subtitled The Lilith Project - A Barbaric Romantic Movie of the Mind. It is a concept album based on Gnostic beliefs, which critically revisits the traditional Christian mythology about the creation of the Earth and the Biblical accounts of Adam and Eve.

The story revolves around Lilith, the first wife of Adam and a symbol of female strength and independence. Representing the female side of the true, higher god, she suffers under the lusting, jealous Demiurge who represents the Christian god, and as an emancipated woman who could not get along with the dominant Adam stands in stark contrast to Eve. Adam's second wife is portrayed as a docile, subservient partner created by the demiurge at the request of Adam, who could not cope with an independent woman on equal footing with him.

Regarding Visions of Eden, David DeFeis declared: "What it really is, is the soundtrack for a major motion picture that has yet to be made! And by the hammer of Zeus, I will make this film one day. I call this work a Barbaric Romantic movie of the mind.".

In 2003, prior to the album release, the concept was performed on the theater stage by Landestheater Schwaben under the name Lilith (as were the previous Virgin Steele titles The House of Atreus Act I and The House of Atreus Act II).

On 17 February 2017, the album was reissued as a double CD containing a remixed version and a remastered recording of the original mix.

Track listing
All songs written by David DeFeis

Personnel

Band members
David DeFeis - all vocals, keyboards, orchestration, effects, producer
Edward Pursino - acoustic and electric guitars, bass
Frank Gilchriest - drums

References

2006 albums
Virgin Steele albums
Concept albums
Sanctuary Records albums